Propylene carbonate (often abbreviated PC) is an organic compound with the formula C4H6O3. It is a cyclic carbonate ester derived from propylene glycol. This colorless and odorless liquid is useful as a polar, aprotic solvent.  Propylene carbonate is chiral, but is used as the racemic mixture in most contexts.

Preparation
Although many organic carbonates are produced using phosgene, propylene and ethylene carbonates are exceptions.  They are mainly prepared by the carbonation of the epoxides (epoxypropane, or propylene oxide here):
CH3CHCH2O  +  CO2   →   CH3C2H3O2CO
The process is particularly attractive since the production of these epoxides consumes carbon dioxide.  Thus this reaction is a good example of a green process.  The corresponding reaction of 1,2-propanediol with phosgene is complex, yielding not only propylene carbonate but also oligomeric products.

Propylene carbonate can also be synthesized from urea and propylene glycol over  zinc acetate.

Applications

As a solvent
Propylene carbonate is used as a polar, aprotic solvent.  It has a high molecular dipole moment (4.9 D), considerably higher than those of acetone (2.91 D) and ethyl acetate (1.78 D). It is possible, for example, to obtain potassium, sodium, and other alkali metals by electrolysis of their chlorides and other salts dissolved in propylene carbonate.

Electrolyte 
Due to its high relative permittivity (dielectric constant) of 64, it is frequently used as a high-permittivity component of electrolytes in lithium batteries, usually together with a low-viscosity solvent (e.g. dimethoxyethane).  Its high polarity allows it to create an effective solvation shell around lithium ions, thereby creating a conductive electrolyte. However, it is not used in lithium-ion batteries due to its destructive effect on graphite.

Propylene carbonate can also be found in some adhesives, paint strippers, and in cosmetics.  It is also used as plasticizer.  Propylene carbonate is also used as a solvent for removal of CO2 from natural gas and synthesis gas where H2S is not also present.  This use was developed by El Paso Natural Gas Company and Fluor Corporation in the 1950s for use at the Terrell County Gas Plant in West Texas, now owned by Occidental Petroleum.

Other
Propylene carbonate product may be converted to other carbonate esters by transesterification as well (see Carbonate ester#Carbonate transesterification).

In electrospray ionization mass spectrometry, propylene carbonate is doped into low surface tension solutions to increase analyte charging.

In Grignard reaction propylene carbonate (or most other carbonate esters) might be used to create tertiary alcohols.

Safety
Clinical studies indicate that propylene carbonate does not cause skin irritation or sensitization when used in cosmetic preparations, whereas moderate skin irritation is observed when used undiluted. No significant toxic effects were observed in rats fed propylene carbonate, exposed to the vapor, or exposed to the undiluted liquid. In the US, propylene carbonate is not regulated as a volatile organic compound (VOC) because it does not contribute significantly to the formation of smog and because its vapor is not known or suspected to cause cancer or other toxic effects.

See also 

 Ethylene carbonate
 Trimethylene carbonate

References 

Ester solvents
Plasticizers
Carbonate esters